Charles James Partridge (born December 7, 1973) is an American college football coach. He is the assistant head football coach and defensive line coach at the University of Pittsburgh, a position he has held since 2018. Partridge served as the head football coach at Florida Atlantic University from 2014 to 2016.

Playing career
A native of Plantation, Florida, Partridge attended Drake University, where he was a team captain of the football team. Later he also attended Iowa State University.

Coaching career
Partridge's first coaching experience was as a graduate assistant with the Drake Bulldogs and the Iowa State Cyclones. From there he became the defensive line coach of the Eastern Illinois Panthers. Partridge served as defensive line coach, linebackers coach, and special teams coordinator of the Pitt Panthers for five seasons before joining the Wisconsin Badgers. He was named co-defensive coordinator at Wisconsin in January 2011. On December 15, 2012 the University of Arkansas announced the hiring of Partridge as the defensive line coach. Partridge was widely credited as Wisconsin's lead recruiter in the state of Florida, and helped land five-star running back Alex Collins for the Razorbacks in his first two months on the job. Partridge followed former Wisconsin Badgers head coach Bret Bielema to Arkansas.

Partridge was hired as the head coach at Florida Atlantic on December 16, 2013. He was fired on November 27, 2016.
On February 14, 2017 Partridge was announced as the defensive line coach at Pittsburgh.

Personal life
Partridge is married with two children.

Head coaching record

References

External links
 Pittsburgh profile

1973 births
Living people
American football defensive linemen
Arkansas Razorbacks football coaches
Drake Bulldogs football coaches
Drake Bulldogs football players
Eastern Illinois Panthers football coaches
Florida Atlantic Owls football coaches
Iowa State Cyclones football coaches
Pittsburgh Panthers football coaches
Wisconsin Badgers football coaches
Iowa State University alumni
People from Plantation, Florida
Partridge, Charles
Sportspeople from Broward County, Florida
Coaches of American football from Florida
Players of American football from Florida